Diadegma argentellae is a wasp first described by Horstmann in 2004. No subspecies are listed.

References

argentellae
Insects described in 2004